John Wolf Brennan (born 13 February 1954) is an Irish pianist, organist, melodica player, and composer based in Weggis, Switzerland.

Career

Brennan was born in Dublin, Ireland. His family moved to Switzerland when he was seven years old. He began taking piano lessons at age eleven, played bass guitar in a rock band in 1970, then played keyboards in a jazz-rock band. He studied at the University of Fribourg (late 1970s), Swiss Jazz School in Bern (1975–79), the conservatory in Lucerne (1979–84), and the Academy of Church and School Music (1985–87). His brother Peter Wolf, a singer, saxophonist, flautist, and oboist, founded the progressive rock band Flame Dream in 1977. During the same year Brennan founded the free jazz group Freemprovisations, which included Peter Schärli. Two years later he formed the band Impetus.

From 1980-84, he played in Impetus and the Mohrenkopf Afro-jazz band from 1980–82 in Triumbajo with Ushma Agnes Baumeler and Barni Palm. During the 1980s he also worked with Corin Curschellas, Christy Doran, and Urs Leimgruber. In 1988, he worked in New York City for six months, then founded the quartet Pago Libre the following year.

Early in the 1990s he worked with Lindsay Cooper, Daniele Patumi, and Tscho Theissing and established the SinFONietta ensemble in 1991. In 1993, he worked with American drummer Alex Cline in the quintet Shooting Stars & Traffic Lights. Russian hornist Arkady Shilkloper joined Pago Libre and recorded the albums Pago Libre (1996), Stepping Out (2006), PlatzDADA! (2008) and Fake Foll (2009). 

In 1997, he lived in London and worked with Julie Tippetts, Evan Parker, and Chris Cutler in HeXtet, which set to music poems by Seamus Heaney, Edgar Allan Poe, and Theo Dorgan. In 1999 he toured in Finland with Ivo Perelman and worked with Gianluigi Trovesi, Gianni Coscia, and Daniele Patumi in the quartet Euradici.

Brennan worked with clarinetist Gene Coleman for the Momentum albums and with Christy Doran and Patrice Heral in the group Triangulation, where he developed "comprovisation", a term he coined in 1989. He released the solo albums The Beauty of Fractals (1989), Pictures in a Gallery (2006), and The Speed of Dark (2009). Following his album The Well-Prepared Clavier (1998), he developed prepared piano techniques, creating non-electronic sounds such as "arcopiano", "pizzicatopiano", "tamburopiano", and "sordinopiano".

In 2010, he created the sound installation "Inner & Outer Spaces" with video artist Susanne Hofer for the Lucerne Art Museum, performing  with Gerry Hemingway and Thomas K. J. Mejer. He was in the trio Melos Montis with Hanspeter Wigger and yodel singer Franziska Wigger and in the duo Twinkeys with Esther Flückiger. He formed the band Sonic Roots with Christy Doran, Andreas Gabriel, Marc Halbheer, Heiri Kaenzig, and Marcel Oetiker. 

In 2012, he collaborated with overtone singer Christian Zehnder and Arkady Shilkloper. During the same year he recorded Pilgrims with  guitarist Marco Jencarelli and percussionist Tony Majdalani. In 2018, he founded the trio SOOON with Majdalani and yodel singer Sonja Morgenegg.

Brennan has composed film music, chamber music, and the operas Güdelmäntig (2004) and Night.Shift (2007, based on the poem  "The Age of Anxiety" by W. H. Auden). The first volume of his Sonic Roots series of books (for piano, inspired by Celtic Country Dances) was premiered at the Frankfurt Book Fair in 2010 and published by Pan-Verlag. The second and third (for violin) were published in 2011, the fourth (for clarinet) in 2013, the fifth (for alto saxophone) in 2014.

The Percussion Art Ensemble Berne premiered his composition "Oscillating Orbits" in 2013 for marimba, vibraphone, timpani, and percussion featuring violinist Misa Stefanovic. In 2015, the Neues Orchester Basel commissioned "Traumpfade", a piece for orchestra and overtone soloist Christian Zehnder. For the 30-year anniversary of the Zurich James Joyce Foundation he wrote "Winds of May" for soprano and piano based on Joyce's Chamber Music IX. He wrote a hymn for his Swiss hometown, Weggis, called "s'Wäggiser Lied". For the Alpentöne Festival 2017, he composed "Got hard", an alpine jazz suite for wind orchestra, Pago Libre & Friends (released by Leo Records in 2018). In August 2018, the Tonhalle Orchester Zürich performed his work Traumpfade with soloists Arkady Shilkloper (alphorn) and Christian Zehnder (overtone voice, global yodeling) at the Festival Stubete am See.

In 2019, he wrote most of the choir arrangements for the program Inland by the Zurich female choir "die vogelfreien". He composed music for the play Fluctus and released the albums Nevergreens, Cinémagique 2.0, and Youchz.

Discography

As leader
 The Beauty of Fractals (Creative Works, 1989)
 M.A.P. (L+R, 1990)
 Iritations (Creative Works, 1991)
 Ten Zentences (L+R, 1993)
 Text, Context, Co-Text & Co-Co-Text (Creative Works, 1994)
 Shooting Stars & Traffic Lights (L+R, 1995)
 Moskau-Petuschki & Felix-Szenen (Leo Lab, 1997)
 Through the Ear of a Raindrop (Leo, 1998)
 The Well-Prepared Clavier (Creative Works, 1998)
 Momentum (Leo, 1999)
 EnTropoLogy (For 4 Ears, 1999)
 The Law of Refraction (Leo, 2000)
 Flugel (Creative Works, 2002)
 Momentum 3 (Leo, 2002)
 Time Jumps Space Cracks (Leo, 2002)
 Zero Heroes (Leo, 2003)
 Glockenspiel (Altrisuoni, 2003)
 Klanggang (MiWi, 2003)
 Rising Fall (Leo, 2005)
 I.N.I.T.I.A.L.S. (Creative Works, 2005)
 Pictures in a Gallery (Leo, 2006)
 The Speed of Dark (Leo, 2009)
 Pilgrims (Leo, 2013)

With Pago Libre
 Extempora (Splasc(H), 1990)
 Pago Libre (L+R, 1996)
 Wake Up Call (Leo, 1999)
 Cinemagique (TCB, 2001)
 Phoenix (Leo, 2003)
 Stepping Out (Leo, 2005)
 Platz Dada! (Christoph Merian Verlag, 2008)
 Fake Folk (Zappel Music, 2009)
 Got Hard (Leo, 2018)
 Mountain Songlines (Leo, 2020)

As sideman
 Corina Curschellas, Entupadas (Creative Works, 1988)
 Robert Dick, Aurealis (Victo, 1997)
 Christy Doran, Henceforward (Core, 1989)
 Christy Doran, Triangulation (Leo, 2004)
 Urs Leimgruber, Mountain Hymn (L+R, 1986)
 Urs Leimgruber, An Chara A Cara (L+R, 1988)
 Urs Leimgruber, Polyphyllum (L+R, 1989)

References 

[ John Wolf Brennan] at Allmusic
Simon Adams, "John Wolf Brennan". Grove Jazz online.
Richard Cook & Brian Morton, The Penguin Guide to Jazz (8th edition). London 2006

1954 births
Living people
20th-century classical composers
20th-century male musicians
21st-century classical pianists
21st-century male musicians
Irish classical composers
Swiss classical pianists
Swiss jazz musicians
Swiss male classical composers
Swiss opera composers
Leo Records artists
Male classical pianists
Male jazz musicians
Male opera composers
Irish emigrants to Switzerland
20th-century Swiss composers